Elsa Fermbäck (born 28 March 1998) is a Swedish World Cup alpine ski racer.

Fermbäck made her World Cup debut in November 2018 in Levi, Finland. Her best result in World Cup to date is a 21st place in slalom from 2021. She participated at the 2021 World Ski Championships, where she achieved a 16th place in slalom.

World Championship results

References

1998 births
Living people
Swedish female alpine skiers
Alpine skiers at the 2022 Winter Olympics
Olympic alpine skiers of Sweden
People from Östersund
Sportspeople from Jämtland County
21st-century Swedish women